Gilberto Aristizábal Murcia (born September 8, 1940) is a retired Colombian football referee. He is known for having refereed one match in the 1982 FIFA World Cup in Spain.

References
Profile

1940 births
Colombian people of Basque descent
Colombian football referees
FIFA World Cup referees
Living people
1982 FIFA World Cup referees
Copa América referees
Place of birth missing (living people)